Barton Gravel Pit is a  nature reserve east of Barton-le-Clay in Bedfordshire. It is managed by the Wildlife Trust for Bedfordshire, Cambridgeshire and Northamptonshire.

This former gravel pit has been partially filled in to become flower-rich chalk grassland. Plants include knotted hedge-parsley, common poppy and great pignut. Mature beech trees provide a habitat for the white helleborine orchid.

There is access from the second public bridleway on the right off Hexton Road, proceeding from Barton-le-Clay. When the path turns left, the site is 100 metres on the left. There are no signs or information board on the site.

References 

Nature reserves in Bedfordshire
Wildlife Trust for Bedfordshire, Cambridgeshire and Northamptonshire reserves